Ramon Halmai (born 18 April 1994) is a Hungarian football player who currently plays for Szombathelyi Haladás.

Club statistics

Updated to games played as of 9 December 2014.

References
MLSZ

1994 births
Living people
Hungarian footballers
Association football midfielders
Szombathelyi Haladás footballers
MTK Budapest FC players
Nemzeti Bajnokság I players
People from Brasschaat